Saros cycle series 138 for lunar eclipses occurs at the moon's ascending node, 18 years 11 and 1/3 days. It contains 82 events.

Summary

List

See also 
 List of lunar eclipses
 List of Saros series for lunar eclipses

Notes

External links 
 www.hermit.org: Saros 138

Lunar saros series